Sleeper is the debut album by Godstar, released in 1993.

Critical reception
AllMusic wrote that "the songs are unpretentious but extremely catchy." Trouser Press called the album full of "chiming guitars and charming vocals." Spin called it "14 pure power pop shots to the dome."

Track listing
 "Ersatz"
 "Bad Bad Implication"
 "Little Bit About"
 "Single"
 "Everything You Give Me Breaks"
 "Wigram"
 "Forgotten Night"
 "Lie Down Forever" (Tom Morgan, Robin St. Clare)
 "The Brightest Star"
 "Had The Time Of My Life"
 "Stranger"
 "Days Gone By"
 "Something Unplanned"
 "Every Now & Again"

All songs written by Nic Dalton except where indicated.

Personnel
 Nic Dalton
 Tom Morgan
 Robin St. Clare
 Alison Galloway
 Bob Weston
 Evan Dando
 Rachel King

References

1993 albums
Godstar (band) albums